Manase Fainu (born 17 October 1998) is a convicted criminal and former Tonga international rugby league footballer who played as a  for the Manly-Warringah Sea Eagles in the NRL.

Background
Fainu was born in Sydney, New South Wales, Australia.  He is of Tongan descent on his mother's side and his father's side. His uncle, Tevita Amone, played for the Western Suburbs Magpies and the North Queensland Cowboys.

He attended Patrician Brothers' College, Fairfield as well as Westfields Sports High School and played his junior rugby league for the Guildford Owls. 

He has three younger brothers, Sione, Samuela and Latu, who are all signed to the Manly club.

Playing career
Fainu made his NRL debut in round 16 of the 2018 NRL season for Manly-Warringah against the Penrith Panthers.  Fainu then signed with the Manly-Warringah Sea Eagles for a further two years extending his contract until the end of 2020.  Fainu made a total of 25 appearances for Manly in the 2019 NRL season as the club finished 6th on the table and qualified for the finals.  Fainu played in both of Manly's finals games against Cronulla-Sutherland and South Sydney in which the club was eliminated in the second week by Souths. His excellent form in 2019 and a great combination formed with Tom Trbojevic saw Manly let Apisai Koroisau go to the Panthers only to have Fainu stood down in the NRL's no Fault stand down policy for allegedly stabbing a man outside a church.

Criminal conviction
In July 2018, Fainu was charged with filming a sex act without consent. Fainu pleaded guilty to the incident in September 2018 but avoided conviction. 

On 29 October 2019, Fainu was charged by police for stabbing a man with a 10 cm knife at a church dance.  It was alleged that Fainu produced the knife and stabbed the man after a confrontation.  Fainu presented himself to NSW police at Liverpool following the incident and was charged with intent to cause grievous bodily harm, affray and recklessly cause grievous bodily harm in company.

On 16 December 2019, Fainu's case was adjourned until 3 February 2020 after he failed to attend court due to an ongoing shoulder injury. Justice Stephen Rothman granted the order under the conditions that Fainu surrendered his passport, reported to police daily, provided a $10,000 surety and would remain at home.

On 11 August 2022, a jury found Fainu guilty of wounding with intent to cause grievous bodily harm. On 2 December 2022, he was sentenced to eight years in prison with a non-parole period of four years and three months.

References

External links
Manly Sea Eagles profile

1998 births
Living people
Australian criminals
Australian people of Māori descent
Australian sportspeople of Tongan descent
Australian rugby league players
Manly Warringah Sea Eagles players
Rugby league hookers
Rugby league players from Sydney
Tonga national rugby league team players